The 2009 European Amateur Team Championship took place 30 June – 4 July at Conwy Golf Club in Conwy County Borough, Wales, United Kingdom. It was the 27th men's golf European Amateur Team Championship.

Venue 

Conwy Golf Club was formed in 1890. Its links course in Conwy County Borough, on the north coast of Wales, was designed by Jack Morris, club professional at Royal Liverpool Golf Club and nephew of Old Tom Morris, the first nine holes in 1875 and additional nine holes in 1895.

The championship course was set up with par 72.

Format 
Each team consisted of 6 players, playing two rounds of stroke-play over two days, counting the five best scores each day for each team.

The eight best teams formed flight A, in knock-out match-play over the next three days. The teams were seeded based on their positions after the stroke play. The first placed team were drawn to play the quarter final against the eight placed team, the second against the seventh, the third against the sixth and the fourth against the fifth. Teams were allowed to use six players during the team matches, selecting four of them in the two morning foursome games and five players in to the afternoon single games. Teams knocked out after the quarter finals played one foursome game and four single games in each of their remaining  matches. Games all square at the 18th hole were declared halved, if the team match was already decided.

The eight teams placed 9–16 in the qualification stroke-play formed flight B, to play similar knock-out play, with one foursome game and four single games in each match, to decide their final positions.

The four teams placed 17–20 formed flight C, to play each other in a round-robin system, with one foursome game and four single games in each match, to decide their final positions.

Teams 
20 nation teams contested the event, the same number of teams as at the previous event one year earlier. Each team consisted of six players.

Players in the leading teams

Other participating teams

Winners 
Team Norway won the opening 36-hole competition, with a 30-under-par score of 690, three strokes ahead of team Italy. Neither host nation Wales or defending champions Ireland mad it to the quarter finals, finishing 10th and 11th respectively.

There was no official award for the lowest individual score, but tied individual leaders were 16-year-old Matteo Manassero, Italy and Pontus Widegren, Sweden, each with a 10-under-par score of 134, one stroke ahead of Andrea Pavan, Italy.

Team Scotland won the gold medal, earning their sixth title, beating team England in the final 5–2.

Team Italy, earned the bronze on third place, after beating Norway 5–2 in the bronze match.

Results 
Qualification round

Team standings

* Note: In the event of a tie the order was determined by the best total of the two non-counting scores of the two rounds.

Individual leaders

 Note: There was no official award for the lowest individual score.

Flight A

Bracket

Final games

Flight B

Bracket

Flight C

First round

Second round

Third round

Final standings

Sources:

See also 
 Eisenhower Trophy – biennial world amateur team golf championship for men organized by the International Golf Federation.
 European Ladies' Team Championship – European amateur team golf championship for women organised by the European Golf Association.

References

External links 
 European Golf Association: Full results

European Amateur Team Championship
Golf tournaments in Wales
European Amateur Team Championship
European Amateur Team Championship
European Amateur Team Championship
European Amateur Team Championship